The name Eileen has been used for three tropical cyclones in the Eastern Pacific Ocean.
 Hurricane Eileen (1966)
 Tropical Storm Eileen (1970)
 Tropical Storm Eileen (1974)

The name Eileen has also been used for one tropical cyclone in the Western Pacific Ocean.
 Tropical Storm Eileen (1947)

The name Eileen has also been used for one tropical cyclone in the Southwest Indian Ocean.
 Cyclone Eileen (1964)

See also
Storm Aileen (2017), an alternate spelling of the name used in the UK and Ireland's windstorm naming system.

Pacific hurricane set index articles
Pacific typhoon set index articles
South-West Indian Ocean cyclone set index articles